Hallia is a taxonomic synonym that may refer to:

Hallia  = Alysicarpus
Hallia  = Psoralea

References